Members of the New South Wales Legislative Assembly who served in the eighth parliament of New South Wales held their seats from 1874 to 1877. The 1874–75 election was held between 8 December 1874 and 12 January 1875 with parliament first meeting on 27 January 1875. There were 72 members elected for 52 single member electorates, 6 two member electorates and 2 four member electorates. During this parliament the number of graduates of Sydney University exceeded 100 and the seat of University of Sydney was created. The maximum term of this parliament was 3 years and the assembly was dissolved after 34 months. Premiers during this parliament were Sir John Robertson 9 February 1875 till 22 March 1877 and from 17 August 1877 and Sir Henry Parkes 22 March 1877 till 17 August 1877. The Speaker was William Arnold until his death on 1 March 1875 and then George Allen.

See also
Third Robertson ministry
Second Parkes ministry
Results of the 1874–75 New South Wales colonial election
Candidates of the 1874–75 New South Wales colonial election

Notes
There was no party system in New South Wales politics until 1887. Under the constitution, ministers were required to resign to recontest their seats in a by-election when appointed. These by-elections are only noted when the minister was defeated; in general, he was elected unopposed.

References

Members of New South Wales parliaments by term
19th-century Australian politicians